Djursholm is one of four suburban districts in, and the seat of Danderyd Municipality, Stockholm County, Sweden. Djursholm is included in the multi-municipal Stockholm urban area. Djursholm is divided into a number of different areas: Djursholms Ekeby (northwest), Svalnäs (northeast), Ösby (central), Berga (southwest) and Gamla Djursholm ('Old Djursholm', southeast). It is also partly located in Täby Municipality.

History
Djursholm was one of the first suburban communities in Sweden, its history as such beginning in 1889 with the founding of Djursholm AB (Djursholm Inc.) by Henrik Palme and the subsequent 1890 inauguration of the railway line connecting Djursholm to Stockholm, Djursholmsbanan. Since 1895 it has been served by electric suburban trains but the original branch was closed in 1975.

Djursholm is the wealthiest community in Sweden, with the most expensive property prices in the country. It was built as a garden city with large villas, most from the turn of the century, along winding roads. From the start, the elegant seaside quarters attracted many well known academics, cultural personalities and industrialists.

Djursholm was separated from Danderyd as a municipality of its own in 1901, becoming a city (Djursholms stad) in 1914. In 1971 it was reunited with Danderyd when the present municipality was created. Statistically Djursholm lies within the Stockholm urban area.

Sights
 Djursholm Castle. The original stone building was likely erected by Nils Eskilsson Banér in the 15th century. Svante Gustavsson Banér commissioned a refurbishment of the castle to its current form in the 16th century
 Djursholm Chapel. Completed in 1902 on the initiative of Fredrik Lilljekvist, who was also the architect. The ornate altar paintings are by Natanael Beskow, who was the resident vicar at the time.
 Villa Pauli. Large villa on Strandvägen in central Djursholm, designed by Ragnar Östberg and completed in 1907. Since 1986, Villa Pauli has been a private club with a gourmet restaurant, banquet room and hotel.
 Germania beach. Sandy beach that has become a popular destination for people from Djursholm and surrounding areas. Situated at the end of Strandvägen and Germaniavägen, two of the central roads of Djursholm.

Gallery

Notable inhabitants 

Alice Tegnér, artist
Annika Falkengren, industrialist
Annika Linde, state epidemiologist
Bertil Hult, industrialist
Björn Ulvaeus, musician (ABBA)
Charlotte Perrelli, singer
Elizabeth Hesselblad, saint
Elsa Beskow, artist and author
Prince Erik, Duke of Västmanland 
Fredrik Lundberg, industrialist
Gösta Mittag-Leffler, mathematician
Hannes Alfvén, nobel laureate in physics
Ingvar Kjellson, actor
Jacob Wallenberg, industrialist
Jakob Lindberg, musician
Jan Carlzon, industrialist
Jenny Syquia, model and designer
Johan Banér, fieldmarshall
Magnus Uggla, singer and songwriter
Marie Fredriksson, musician (Roxette)
Natanael Beskow, preacher, author, artist
Robert Thegerström, artist
Robin Soderling, former professional tennis player
Stefan Persson, industrialist
Tove Lo, singer and songwriter
Verner von Heidenstam, author
Viktor Rydberg, author

References

External links 
History of Djursholm (in Swedish) - at Stockholm University

Metropolitan Stockholm
Stockholm urban area